Hacienda Juanita (built 1833-34) is a coffee plantation hacienda in the town of Maricao, Puerto Rico. The  design is based on typical Puerto Rican culture, and was commissioned by the wife of a Spanish official. Coffee production at the hacienda declined from the 1960s.

Hotel
From 1976 it was converted, with government assistance, into one of Puerto Rico's earliest paradores, and ran, administered by the Puerto Rico Tourism Company, as a 21-room agro-hotel. The parador passed to new private owners in 2005 but closed in 2011. The hotel had hosted a Sala del Parador, a permanent exhibit of antique artifacts related to Puerto Rican coffee production.

Flora and fauna
The  of lands are home to a number of floral and animal species including:

 Puerto Rican owl
 Puerto Rican lizard cuckoo
 Puerto Rican woodpecker
 Puerto Rican emerald
 Green mango
 Puerto Rican tody
 Loggerhead kingbird
 Puerto Rican flycatcher
 Red-legged thrush
 Puerto Rican oriole
 Antillean euphonia
 Puerto Rican spindalis
 Puerto Rican tanager
 Puerto Rican bullfinch

Nearby attractions
 Centro Vacacional Monte del Estado
 Maricao Fish Hatchery
 Maricao State Forest (Monte del Estado)

See also
 List of hotels in Puerto Rico

References

1976 establishments in Puerto Rico
Hotels in Puerto Rico
Tourist attractions in Puerto Rico
Juanita
Coffee production